The Theodore Solomons Trail is a long-distance trail in the Sierra Nevada mountain range of California, passing through Yosemite,  Kings Canyon and Sequoia National Parks, and the Sierra National Forest. For almost all of its length, the trail is in the Middle Sierra backcountry and wilderness areas.

The trail was developed by Dennis R. Gagnon in 1974 as a lower elevation alternative to the popular John Muir Trail which it runs largely parallel to. The trail was named for the explorer Theodore Solomons.

See also
 Ecology of the Sierra Nevada
 Long-distance trails in the United States
 Sierra High Route

References

External links 
 Overview and Map of the Theodore Solomons Trail

Hiking trails in California
Sierra Nevada (United States)
Long-distance trails in the United States
Sequoia National Park
Kings Canyon National Park
Yosemite National Park
Sierra National Forest
1974 establishments in California